Beijing Love Story (Chinese: 北京爱情故事) is a 2012 Chinese television series co-scripted and directed by Chen Sicheng, starring himself, Li Chen, Zhang Yi, Tong Liya, Yang Mi, Zhang Xinyi and Monica Mok. This is Chen Sicheng's directorial debut. It premiered on Zhejiang TV on 8 January 2012.

The series was one of the most watched during its broadcast. More than 1 billion views were recorded on Chinese video streaming sites by 9 February 2012, just 32 days after the first episode aired. Following the success, Chen later directed a 2014 film of the same name, which was a huge box office success. (Also befitting for a love story, he fell in love with co-star Tong Liya on the set and married her in 2014.)

Synopsis 
Cheng Feng (Chen Sicheng), Wu Di (Li Chen) and Shi Xiaomeng (Zhang Yi) were good friends in their university days in Beijing, and formed a small band together. All three guys have different backgrounds and characters, but common aspiration and interest brought them together. The drama tells the story of how the three good friends face problems of love and career together.

Cast 
 Chen Sicheng as Cheng Feng
The playboy son of a successful business man, who has a complicated relationship with his father.
 Li Chen as Wu Di
A honest, dependable and hardworking man.
 Zhang Yi as Shi Xiaomeng
A guy who comes from a poor background in countryside Yunan, and his dream is to become successful in Beijing. 
Tong Liya as Shen Bing
The long-time girlfriend of Shi Xiaomeng, who comes from Yunan to Beijing to live with him. Her father died saving her when she was young, and she is left with an old and sickly mother. Cheng Feng sees her and immediately falls in love with her. 
 Yang Mi as Yang Zixi 
A magazine editor of a publishing house. She is Wu Di's ex-girlfriend, who broke up with him as she felt that he had no future. She falls in love with playboy Andy, but was later dumped by him.
 Zhang Xinyi as Lin Xia 
A magazine editor of at a publishing house. She is Cheng Feng's ex-girlfriend. Despite Cheng Feng's playboy tendencies, she feels that he treats her differently. However, she does not know that Cheng Feng only treats her as a normal friend. 
 Monica Mok as Wu Mei 
A high ranked executive at a finance company. She is Wu Di's boss, and also the ex-girlfriend of Wu Qiu (Wu Di's step brother). She was attracted to Wu Di's honest personality, and ends up together with him.

Soundtrack

Awards

International broadcast
China – Zhejiang Television, January 8, 2012
Hong Kong – TVB, June 24, 2012 (Mandarin), December 15, 2014 (Cantonese dub)
USA – International Chinese Network, August 1, 2012
Nigeria – Nigerian Television Authority, September 8, 2013 (dubbed in Hausa, as Soyayyar Matasan Beijing)
Philippines - PTV, unknown date (dubbed in Filipino)
Indonesia – Vision 2 Drama, May 12, 2014
Taiwan – Eye TV, August 16, 2014
Fiji – Fiji Television, November 20, 2014
Uganda – NBS Television, February 19, 2015
Botswana – Botswana TV, April 17, 2015

References

External links

2012 Chinese television series debuts
Zhejiang Television original programming
2012 Chinese television series endings
Television shows adapted into films
Chinese romance television series
Television series by New Classics Media
Television shows set in Beijing